Abdulaziz Al Ansari (born 19 February 1992) is a Qatari footballer who currently plays for Al Arabi as a striker. He also plays for the Qatar national olympic team.

Career
Ansari joined Al Sadd's senior team when he was 16 years old, after previously playing for their youth team. Since then, he has played mostly on the reserve team, scoring 27 goals in 28 appearances. In addition, he scored 50 goals in 15 games in the U-17 league. Ansari was awarded Best Player Under-21 by QFA two times.

In March 2011, he had a trial with Premier League side West Ham United. It was widely reported that he had joined the English outfit and was mentioned in a FIFA.com  news article. However, the move never materialized.

In the Summer of 2013, he joined Belgian Second Division side K.A.S. Eupen but made one appearance as a substitute until the transfer window opened on 1 January 2014. He returned to his former team Al Sadd.

Honours

Al Sadd
 amir cup 2014-2015 : 1
 Asian Champions League: 1
 Qatari Stars Cup:  1
 Qatari Reserves League: 1
 Sheikh Jassim Cup : runner up
 FIFA Club World Cup : bronze medal

Al Kharaitiyat
 GCC Champions League
 Semi-finals: 1

Qatar nation team
 WAFF gold medal

Individual
Reserve League Top Scorer: 2 (2010, 2011)
U-17 League Top Scorer: 1
u-15 league top scorer : 1
'''u-12 league top scorer : 1 all time top scorer u-17 league in one season (42 goal in 18 games)''' aspire tournament top scorer ( 4 goals in 3 games)
'nominated to top 3 young player of the year in 2011-2012 season

Personal
He graduated from  Aspire Academy .

On 8 June 2012, he tied the knot and held a ceremony which Al Sadd, and other QSL players, attended.

External links
Al Sadd - Player profile
Yahoo! Sports - Player profile

References

1992 births
Living people
Al Sadd SC players
Al Kharaitiyat SC players
K.A.S. Eupen players
Al-Arabi SC (Qatar) players
Qatari footballers
Qatar Stars League players
Qatar international footballers
Qatari expatriate footballers
Expatriate footballers in Belgium
Qatari expatriate sportspeople in Belgium
Aspire Academy (Qatar) players
Association football forwards
Qatar youth international footballers